Armand is a French masculine given name and surname, the French form of Herman. 

Notable people with the name include:

Given name
 Saint Herman, aka, Saint Armand

Armand (photographer) (1901–63), Armenian photographer
Armand Arabian (1934-2018), American judge
Armand Assante (b. 1949), American actor
Armand Borel (1923–2003), Swiss mathematician,
Armand Brinkhaus (born 1935), Louisiana politician
Armand Călinescu (1893-1939), Romanian Prime Minister
Armand D'Angour (b. 1958), British classicist
Armand de Bourbon, prince de Conti (1629–66), French noble
Armand de Gontaut, baron de Biron (1524–92), French soldier
Armand de Gramont, comte de Guiche (1637–73), French noble
Armand de La Richardie (1686-1758), French Roman Catholic missionary
Armand de Pontmartin (1811–90), French literary critic and essayist
Armand Doré (1824-1882), French painter.
Armand Doria (1824-1896), French art collector.
Armand, duc d'Aiguillon (1750-1800), French noble
Armand Duplantis (born 1999), American-born Swedish athlete
Armand Hammer (1898–1990), American Industrialist
Armand Jean du Plessis de Richelieu (1585–1642), French clergyman and statesman commonly known as Cardinal Richelieu
Armand Lohikoski (1912-2005), Finnish movie director & writer
Armand Mauss (1928–2020), American sociologist of religion
Armand of Kersaint (1742–93), French sailor and politician
Armand Marquiset (1900-1981), French philanthropist
Armand Mouyal (1925–1988), French world champion épée fencer
Armand Peugeot (1849–1915), French industrialist and pioneer of the automobile industry
Armand Van Helden (born 1970), American DJ and musician

Surname
Antoine Armand (born 1991), French politician
Abraham Armand, Roman Catholic priest
David Armand (born 1977), English actor
Émile Armand (1872-1962), French anarchist
Frøydis Armand (born 1949), Norwegian actress
Gesner Armand (born 1936), Haitian painter
Gisken Armand (born 1962), Norwegian actress
Inessa Armand (1874-1920), French communist
Jack Armand (1898–1974), English footballer
Jean Armand de Lestocq (1692-1767), French adventurer
Joseph-François Armand (1820-1903), Canadian politician
Leanne Armand (born 1968), Australian marine scientist
Louis Armand (1905–71), French Resistance member
Patrick Armand, French ballet dancer
Romain Armand (born 1987), French footballer
Sylvain Armand (born 1980), retired French footballer

Fictional characters 

Armand (The Vampire Chronicles), character from The Vampire Chronicles novels
Count Armand, character from the movie The Legend of Zorro
Armand St. Just, character from the Scarlet Pimpernel novels
Armand Duval, character from the romantic novel La Dame aux Camelias
Armand Trevelyan, from Isaac Asimov's novella "Profession".
Armand d'Hubert, protagonist of the Joseph Conrad short story "The Duel" (1908) and Ridley Scott film The Duellists (1977)
Armand D'Argencourt, character from Miraculous: Tales of Ladybug and Cat Noir
Armand Goldman, drag club owner played by Robin Williams in the film The Birdcage
Armand Gamache,  character from Louise Penny's mysteries
Armand Beauxhomme, character from the musical "Once On This Island

References

See also 
Armand Commission, first commission of the European Atomic Energy Community
Armand de Brignac, champagne brand produced by Champagne Cattier
Armand's Legion, Continental Army military unit
St Armand (disambiguation)
Saint-Armand, Quebec
St. Armand, New York
St. Armand's Key in Florida
Arman (name)

French-language surnames
French masculine given names
English masculine given names
Surnames from given names
es:Armand
fr:Armand
ja:アルマン
pt:Armand